Tracey Takes On... was an HBO comedy series, running for four seasons from 1996 to 1999. It received multiple awards and nominations. The series won a total of 6 Emmy awards. The awards and nominations are listed here.

Awards and nominations

American Comedy Awards

CableACE Awards

Costume Designers Guild Awards

Directors Guild of America Awards

GLAAD Media Awards

Golden Globe Awards

Online Film & Television Association

Primetime Emmy Awards
Tracey Takes On... was nominated for 24 Primetime Emmy Awards, winning a total of 6.

Satellite Awards

Screen Actors Guild Awards

Writers Guild of America Awards

External links
 Accolades received by Tracey Takes On... at the Internet Movie Database
 Tracey Takes On... at the Academy of Television Arts & Sciences web site
 Golden Globe awards website
 Screen Actors Guild website

Tracey Takes On...